Castilleja rubicundula is a species of Indian paintbrush known by the common name cream sacs. It is native to northern California and southwestern Oregon. It is found in coastal and inland grasslands.

Description
Castilleja rubicundula is a hairy, glandular annual growing to about half a meter in height, the stem leafy with lance-shaped foliage.

It produces a terminal inflorescence and sometimes branches off several more inflorescences. The white, pink, yellow, or bicolored flowers are divided into usually three pouches, making them look inflated. Each pouch is about a centimeter wide and half a centimeter deep. Each flower has a beak extending about half a centimeter above the pouches.

The fruit is a capsule containing tiny seeds less than a millimeter long. Under magnification the seed's honeycomb-patterned coat is visible.

Subspecies
Subspecies and varieties include:
Castilleja rubicundula ssp. lithospermoides
Castilleja rubicundula ssp. rubicundula — endemic to the Sacramento Valley, California.
Castilleja rubicundula var. rubicundula

Distribution and habitat
This annual wildflower is native to northern California, and into southwestern Oregon. It lives on coastal and inland grasslands.

References

External links
UC Photos gallery — Castilleja rubicundula

rubicundula
Flora of California
Flora of Oregon
Natural history of the California chaparral and woodlands
Natural history of the California Coast Ranges
Natural history of the Central Valley (California)
Natural history of the San Francisco Bay Area
Flora without expected TNC conservation status